Hakea ceratophylla, commonly known as the horned leaf hakea, is a shrub in the family) Proteaceae and is endemic to the southwest of Western Australia. It is a stiff shrub with variably-shaped leaves that are sometimes lobed and flowers with white or rusty-coloured hairs.

Description
Its young branchlets and leaves are covered with rust coloured hairs but become glabrous as they age. The flowers are arranged in umbels containing between two and ten flowers with no apparent stalk.

Taxonomy and naming
The horned leaf hakea was first formally described in 1807 by James Edward Smith who gave it the name Conchium ceratophyllum and published the description in Rees's Cyclopædia. The type specimen was collected at King Georges Sound by Archibald Menzies. Smith noted "It is one of the handsomest of its genus". In 1810 Robert Brown changed the name to Hakea ceratophylla. The specific epithet (ceratophylla) is derived from the Ancient Greek words keras, keratos meaning "horn" and phyllon meaning "leaf" apparently referring to the leaves which in some forms have horn-like lobes.

Distribution
The shrub is found in southern areas of Western Australia in the Peel, South West and Great Southern regions of Western Australia where it grows on seasonally damp flats and among granite outcrops in sandy, loamy or gravelly soils. The plants range is from near Perth in the north and south to around Albany and inland to around the Stirling Range area where it grows in heath or Melaleuca woodland communities.

References

ceratophylla
Eudicots of Western Australia
Plants described in 1810
Taxa named by Robert Brown (botanist, born 1773)